Francis William Thring (2 December 1882 – 1 July 1936), better known as F. W. Thring, was an Australian film director, producer, and exhibitor. He has been credited with the invention of the clapperboard.

Early life
Francis William Thring (or William Francis Thring) was born on 2 December 1882 in Wentworth, New South Wales, the son of a labourer, William Frances Thring(?), and Angelina Thring (née McDonald).

Although sometimes known as Frank Thring Sr, on account of well-known son Frank Thring Jr., the subject of this article is actually Francis William III. His forbears were Francis William Thring (1812-1887) and Francis William Thring(?), known as William Thring (1858-1920). F.W. Thring (1812-1887) had two sons, both of whom were given their father's name. The first of these was illegitimate, but the second one was born after his marriage, and the Thring line continued through the legitimate son.

Career
Thring worked as a conjurer in the outback and as a bootmaker in Gawler, South Australia, as well as starting Biograph Pictures in Tasmania. In 1911, he became a projectionist at Kreitmayer's Waxworks in Melbourne, Victoria. He thrived in the cinema trade and opened the Paramount Theatre in 1915 and became managing director of J. C. Williamson's Films in 1918, which eventually merged to become Hoyts in 1926.

In 1928, Thring personally supervised the building of a new Hoyts picture theatre in Adelaide, the Regent Theatre.

Efftee film studio
In 1930, Thring sold his interests in Hoyts to Fox Film Corporation and went into film production, establishing Efftee Studios (based on his initials). Over the next five years, Efftee produced nine features, over 80 shorts and several stage productions, including the Australian musicals Collits' Inn and The Cedar Tree.

Notable collaborators include C. J. Dennis, George Wallace and Frank Harvey.

Thring visited Britain in 1932–33, where he sold Efftee's entire output: seven features, nine shorts and a series about the Great Barrier Reef made with Noel Monkman.

In 1932 Thring became the leader of a campaign for a quota for Australian films. In 1934, he suspended Efftee's operations, announcing that resumption would depend upon the introduction of an effective quota system in Victoria.

In 1935, Efftee obtained a licence to broadcast from the then-new broadcasting station 3XY in Melbourne, which was owned by the United Australia Party (and later the Liberal Party).

After New South Wales passed its Cinematograph Films (Australian Quota) Act 1935 in September 1935, Thring resumed production in February 1936, in Sydney, becoming chairman of directors of Mastercraft Film Corporation Ltd while remaining managing director of Efftee Film Productions. In March he sailed for Hollywood in search of scriptwriters and actors.

It was estimated Thring lost over £75,000 of his own money on his filmmaking and theatrical ventures.

Other achievements
He is usually credited with the invention of the clapperboard.

Death and family
Thring died of cancer on 1 July 1936, aged 52, in East Melbourne, and was buried in Burwood Cemetery. He was survived by a daughter from his first marriage to Grace Wight (Viola, known as Lola; 1911–71), his second wife, Olive, née Kreitmayer whom he had married on 25 April 1921, and their then 10-year-old son, the future actor Frank Thring.

Lola dated the future Prime Minister Harold Holt but she ultimately rejected him only to marry his divorced father, her father's business partner. Harold Holt thus acquired a step-mother who was three years his junior.  Harold Holt's father, Tom Holt, was in control of Efftee Studios at this time.

Selected filmography 
 The Haunted Barn (1931) – short
 A Co-respondent's Course (1931) – short
 Diggers (1931)
 The Sentimental Bloke (1932)
 His Royal Highness (1932)
 Harmony Row (1933)
 A Ticket in Tatts (1934)
 Sheepmates (1934) – abandoned during shooting
 Clara Gibbings (1934)
 The Streets of London (1934)

Unmade films
adaptation of Redheap by Norman Lindsay
Pick and Duffers – meant to follow His Royal Highness
adaptation of Collitt's Inn
Ginger Murdoch from the novel by William Hatfield with George Wallace
The Black Sheep – meant to star George Wallaca
A Sweepin' in the Deep with George Wallace

Selected theatre credits
Clara Gibbins (August 1933) – Garrick Theatre, Melbourne
Rope (1933)
Collits' Inn (1933)
The Streets of London (1933)
Children in Uniform (1933–34) – Garrick Theatre, Melbourne with Coral Browne
Mother of Pearl (1934)
The Beloved Vagabond (1934)
Jolly Roger (1934)
The Cedar Tree (1934)
Her Past (September 1934)
Peter Pan (December 1934, December 1935)
Crazy Nights Revue (1935) – with George Wallace
S.S. Sunshine (1935)
The Oojah Bird (1935)

See also
Cinema of Australia

References

Further reading

External links 
 
F. W. Thring at Australian Dictionary of Biography
Frank Thring Introduces Stars at Australian Screen Online
F. W. Thring at Australian Screen Online
F. W. Thring at Trove
F. W. Thring Australian theatre credits at AusStage
F. W. Thring at the National Film and Sound Archive

1882 births
1936 deaths
Australian film directors
People from Sydney
Australian theatre managers and producers
Australian film producers